Scott Barrows (born March 31, 1963, in Marietta, Ohio) is a former offensive lineman in the NFL for the Detroit Lions. He was drafted in the 1986 NFL Draft out of West Virginia.

External links
https://web.archive.org/web/20110610103412/http://www.databasefootball.com/players/playerpage.htm?ilkid=BARROSCO01

1963 births
Living people
West Virginia Mountaineers football players
American football offensive linemen
Detroit Lions players